Chechen volunteers on the side of Ukraine are armed Chechen volunteers and other formations fighting on the side of Ukraine in the Russo-Ukrainian war. These formations have been fighting on the side of Ukraine since the start of the conflict in 2014. The Chechen forces position themselves as the Armed Forces of the Chechen Republic of Ichkeria.

History

War in Donbas (2014-2022)
In 2014, there were initial reports of Chechen volunteers who joined Ukraine's side to fight in the Donbas region. Chechens from various European countries and Turkey traveled to Ukraine to support the country, forming two battalions named after national heroes of Chechnya. One of the battalions was named after Dzhokhar Dudayev, the first president of the Chechen Republic of Ichkeria. The other battalion was named after Sheikh Mansur, an 18th-century Chechen military commander and Islamic leader who resisted the Russian imperalist expansion into the Caucasus. These battalions were led by Muslim Cheberloevsky (Umkhan Avtaev) and Isa Munaev, both of whom had participated in the two Russian-Chechen wars.

Isa Munaev was killed in action on January 31, 2015, from a shell explosion in the Battle for Debaltseve. After his death, Adam Osmaev, previously accused of attempting to assassinate Russian President Vladimir Putin, became the battalion commander.

Russian invasion of Ukraine (2022-present)
Amid Russia's invasion of Ukraine, a congress of the Chechen diaspora in Europe was held in Brussels on February 24 to support Ukraine, organized by the State Committee for the De-occupation of the Chechen Republic of Ichkeria led by Akhmed Zakayev, who also heads the Chechen Republic of Ichkeria's government in exile. The congress was attended by leaders of Chechen socio-political organizations, media activists, ex-commanders of the Armed Forces of the Chechen Republic of Ichkeria, war veterans, and other individuals. They decided to form additional Chechen combat units to provide military support to Ukraine in repelling Russian aggression, in addition to the two Chechen battalions already operating in the Donbass region since 2014.

On February 26, 2022, Akhmed Zakayev stated that many of the 300,000 Chechens living in Europe expressed their desire and readiness to fight for Ukraine. He also mentioned that among those willing to go to Ukraine, there were many who had long-term experience in fighting against Russian troops in Chechnya. Several Chechen politicians and supporters of the ChRI living abroad, including Dzhambulat Suleymanov, Musa Lomaev, Anzor Maskhadov, Hussein Iskhanov, Khasan Khalitov, Akhyad Idigov, Musa Taipov, and Mansur Sadulaev, also supported Ukraine and participated in media coverage of the conflict. In May 2022, Maskhadov and Suleimanov visited Ukraine on a diplomatic mission and held meetings with Ukrainian politicians, journalists, and Chechen volunteers from the Sheikh Mansur battalion.

Persecution by Ukraine and Russia

Composition
Armed formations on the side of Ukraine that includes natives of Chechnya and members of the Chechen diaspora abroad:
 Dzhokhar Dudayev Chechen Peacekeeping Battalion
  Sheikh Mansur Chechen Peacekeeping Battalion 
 Separate Special Purpose Battalion "OBON" of the Armed Forces of the Chechen Republic of Ichkeria
 Khamzat Gelayev Battalion
 Special Operations Group ("SOG", Special Operation Group) is a group of Chechen volunteers with extensive combat experience. A very secret unit within the Armed Forces of Ukraine.
 34th Assault Battalion "Mad Pack"
 Krym Battalion
 Muslim Corps Caucasus

Motivation
According to commanders of the Chechen forces, the main goal of their participation in the Russian-Ukrainian war is to continue the long-term national struggle for independence of the Chechen people with Russia and defend the freedom of Ukraine.

The deceased former commander of the Dzhokhar Dudayev Battalion, Isa Munayev had this to say regarding the question, "Why are you here?":

The position of Adam Osmayev regarding the conflict when asked in an interview "What does it mean to you what is happening in Ukraine?", answered the following:

Commander of the Sheikh Mansur Battalion, Muslim Cheberloevsky, had this to say on why he's fighting for Ukraine.

Number of Volunteers
Musa Lomaev, a former representative of the ChRI government in Finland, has stated that many Chechens who participated in the second Russian-Chechen war and the civil war in Syria, as well as Chechen emigrants living outside of Chechnya, are continuing to flow to Ukraine as volunteers. He believes that their numbers will soon reach thousands.

In addition to the existing battalions and paramilitary formations of Chechen volunteers fighting in Ukraine, many Chechens are also serving in various parts of the Ukrainian army.

According to different sources, as of June 2022, up to 500 Chechen volunteers were fighting on the side of Ukraine. Anzor Maskhadov, the head of the "International Movement for the Liberation of Chechnya" organization, reported later that month that another group of 100 Chechen volunteers had recently left Europe for Ukraine.

The number of volunteers has since grown to a thousand people as of August 2022, and to 2,000 people as of November 2022.

See also
Russian invasion of Ukraine (2022–present)
Ukrainian volunteer battalions
Foreign fighters in the Russo-Ukrainian War
International Legion of Territorial Defence of Ukraine

References

2014 establishments in Ukraine
Battalions of Ukraine
Military units and formations established in 2014
Military units and formations of Ukraine in the war in Donbas
Chechen armies in exile
Foreign volunteer units resisting the 2022 Russian invasion of Ukraine
Military units and formations established in 2022
Resistance during the 2022 Russian invasion of Ukraine
Foreign volunteers in the 2022 Russian invasion of Ukraine
Chechen–Russian conflict